Seyed Mostafa Mirhashemi (born 6 August 1974) is an Iranian cross-country skier. He competed in the men's 2 × 10 kilometre pursuit event at the 2002 Winter Olympics.

References

External links
 
 
 

1974 births
Living people
Iranian male cross-country skiers
Olympic cross-country skiers of Iran
Cross-country skiers at the 2002 Winter Olympics
People from Tehran Province
Cross-country skiers at the 1999 Asian Winter Games
Cross-country skiers at the 2003 Asian Winter Games
Cross-country skiers at the 2007 Asian Winter Games
Ski-orienteers at the 2011 Asian Winter Games